Sirkeli is a village in the District of Ceyhan, Adana Province, Turkey.

Near the river there is a carving in the rocks of an ancient Hittite king Muwatalli II.

References

Villages in Ceyhan District